The Yellow and Black Attack is the first release and debut studio album from the Christian metal band Stryper. It was originally released as a six-song EP, and fewer than 20,000 copies were pressed, as their label, Enigma Records, was unsure of the potential market for Christian metal. CCM Magazine was slightly critical, citing production quality and the short length of the release, but commented that "Stryper has the promise of a major success story." According to Michael Sweet's autobiography, the album was re-recorded and released as an official album, after their first manager, Daryn Hinton, loaned them $100,000 to re-produce the record. The album initially sold 150,000 units in the first three weeks.

After Stryper achieved major success with their second release and first full-length album, Soldiers Under Command, The Yellow and Black Attack EP was reissued. Re-released on August 10, 1986 with two additional songs, "Reason for the Season" (which was originally released on a 1985 Christmas-themed 12" single with "Winter Wonderland") and a new, mellowed-down version of "My Love I'll Always Show", which dates from their Roxx Regime days. The version recorded for The Yellow and Black Attack featured less obvious Christian lyrics than the one to feature on The Roxx Regime Demos.

Track listing (1984 EP)
 "Loud 'N' Clear" (Michael Sweet) – 3:34
 "From Wrong to Right" (M. Sweet, Robert Sweet, Oz Fox) – 3:51
 "You Know What to Do" (M. Sweet, R. Sweet, Fox, Tim Gaines) – 4:47
 "Co'mon Rock" (M. Sweet) – 3:46
 "You Won't Be Lonely" (M. Sweet) – 3:43
 "Loving You" (M. Sweet) – 4:15

Track listing (1986 re-release)
 "Loud 'N' Clear" (Michael Sweet) – 3:34
 "From Wrong to Right" (M. Sweet, Robert Sweet, Oz Fox) – 3:51
 "My Love I'll Always Show " (M. Sweet) – 3:38
 "You Know What to Do" (M. Sweet, R. Sweet, Fox, Tim Gaines) – 4:47
 "Co'mon Rock" (M. Sweet) – 3:46
 "You Won't Be Lonely" (M. Sweet) – 3:43
 "Loving You" (M. Sweet) – 4:15
 "Reason for the Season" (M. Sweet, R. Sweet) – 6:30
 "Winter Wonderland" (Japan bonus track) - 3:16

Personnel
Michael Sweet - lead vocals, guitar
Robert Sweet - drums
Oz Fox - lead guitar, background vocals
Tim Gaines - bass guitar, keyboards, background vocals

References

Stryper albums
1984 debut EPs
Heavy metal EPs
Glam metal EPs